Juan Fernando Niño Perdomo (born 15 June 1990) is a Colombian-American footballer who last played as a midfielder for Oklahoma City Energy in the USL.

Career

College & Amateur
Niño played four years of college soccer at Liberty University.

Professional career
Niño signed his first professional contract in 2013, signing for USL Pro club Charlotte Eagles.

Niño in 2015 will be a professional player for Atlético Huila in the Categoría Primera A, in Colombia.

Niño signed with San Antonio FC on February 16, 2017.

References

External links

1990 births
Living people
Colombian footballers
Charlotte Eagles players
Atlético Huila footballers
San Antonio FC players
OKC Energy FC players
Colombian expatriate footballers
Expatriate soccer players in the United States
USL Championship players
Soccer players from Texas
Association football midfielders
Footballers from Bogotá